Adam Charles Clayton (born 13 March 1960) is an English-born Irish musician who is the bass guitarist of the rock band U2. He has resided in County Dublin, Ireland since his family moved to Malahide in 1965, when he was five years old. Clayton attended Mount Temple Comprehensive School, where he met schoolmates with whom he co-founded U2 in 1976. A member of the band since its inception, he has recorded 14 studio albums with U2.

Clayton's bass playing style is noted for its "harmonic syncopation", giving the music a driving rhythm. He is well known for his bass playing on songs such as "Gloria", "New Year's Day", "Bullet the Blue Sky", "With or Without You", "Mysterious Ways", "Vertigo", "Get on Your Boots", and "Magnificent". He has worked on several solo projects throughout his career, such as his work with fellow band member Larry Mullen Jr. on the 1996 version of the "Theme from Mission: Impossible". As a member of U2, Clayton has received 22 Grammy Awards and was inducted into the Rock and Roll Hall of Fame in 2005.

Early life
Adam Charles Clayton, the oldest child of Brian and Jo Clayton, was born on 13 March 1960 in Chinnor, Oxfordshire, England. His father was a pilot with the Royal Air Force, who moved into civil aviation, and his mother was a former airline stewardess. When he was 4 years old, Clayton's father worked in Kenya as a pilot with East African Airways, the family being resident in Nairobi (Clayton regards this as the happiest period of his childhood). In 1965, the family moved to Malahide, northern County Dublin, Ireland, where Clayton's brother Sebastian was born. The Clayton family became friends with the Evans family (including their son David Evans ("The Edge"), who would later co-found the band U2 with Clayton).

When he was eight years old, Clayton was sent to the private junior boarding Castle Park School in Dalkey, southern County Dublin. Not being sports-oriented, Adam did not enjoy the school or respond well to its ethos; he found it difficult to settle socially there.  He was interested in pop music, which students were not allowed to listen to. He joined the School's "Gramphone Society", which met to listen to classical music. He also took piano lessons for a short time. His introduction to the world of popular music was around the age of 10, listening to rock operas such as Jesus Christ Superstar and Hair, and other material that was midway between classical and popular music.

At age 13, Clayton entered the private St Columba's College secondary school in Rathfarnham, Dublin. Here he made friends with other pupils who were enthusiastic about the pop/rock music acts of the period, including the Who, the Beatles, the Grateful Dead, and Carole King. In response he bought a £5 acoustic guitar from a junk-shop near the Dublin quays, and began learning elementary chords and songs. John Leslie, who shared a bunk bed with Clayton at St. Columba's, persuaded him to join in with a school band where Clayton would play the bass guitar for the first time. His mother purchased a bass for him when he was 14 years old on the basis of a given promise that he would commit himself to learn to play the instrument.

Clayton later changed school to the non-boarding Mount Temple Comprehensive School in Dublin, where he met future U2 bandmates Paul Hewson ("Bono") and Larry Mullen Jr., who were also pupils there, and was reunited with his childhood friend David Evans.

Musical career

U2 

In September 1976, Mullen put an advert onto the school's bulletin board seeking other musicians to form a band; Clayton showed up for the first meeting and practice, so did the Edge with his older brother Richard Evans ("Dik"), Bono, and Ivan McCormick and Peter Martin who were two of Mullen's friends. McCormick and Martin left the band soon after its inception.

While the band was a five-piece (consisting of Bono, the Edge, Mullen, Dik Evans, and Clayton) it was known as "Feedback". The name was subsequently changed to "The Hype", but changed to "U2" soon after Dik Evans left. Clayton stood in as the nearest thing that the band had to a manager in its early life, handing over the duties to Paul McGuinness in May 1978. In 1981, around the time of U2's second, spiritually charged album, October, a rift was created in the band between Clayton and McGuinness, and the three other band members. Bono, The Edge, and Mullen had joined a Christian group, and were questioning the compatibility of rock music with their spirituality. However, Clayton, with his more ambiguous religious views, was less concerned, and so was more of an outsider. Clayton is the oldest member of the band.

In 1995, after the Zoo TV Tour and Zooropa album, Clayton headed to New York with bandmate Mullen to receive formal training in the bass; until then Clayton had been entirely self-taught. During that period, he worked on U2's experimental album, released under the pseudonym "Passengers", entitled Original Soundtracks 1. That album features one of the few instances where Clayton has appeared as a vocalist; he spoke the last verse of "Your Blue Room", the album's second single. Prior to this Clayton had only provided live backing vocals to tracks such as "Out of Control", "I Will Follow", "Twilight", and "Bullet the Blue Sky". Since the 1997 PopMart Tour, Clayton has not sung live in any capacity for the band.

Other projects
Clayton has worked on several side projects throughout his career. He played (along with the other members of U2) on Robbie Robertson's self-titled album from 1987, and has also performed with Maria McKee. Clayton played on the song "The Marguerita Suite" on Sharon Shannon's self-titled debut album which was released in October 1991. He joined U2 producer Daniel Lanois and bandmate Larry Mullen Jr. on Lanois's 1989 album Acadie, playing the bass on the songs "Still Water" and "Jolie Louise". In 1994, Clayton played bass alongside Mullen on Nanci Griffith's album Flyer, appearing on the songs "These Days in an Open Book", "Don't Forget About Me", "On Grafton Street" and "This Heart". In 1996, Clayton and Mullen contributed to the soundtrack to the 1996 film Mission: Impossible by re-recording the "Theme from Mission: Impossible". The song reached number 7 on the Billboard Hot 100, and was nominated for the Grammy Award for Best Pop Instrumental Performance (Orchestra, Group or Soloist) in 1997. Clayton was also featured on Steven Van Zandt's 1999 album Born Again Savage.

Musical style

Clayton's style of bass guitar playing is noted for what instructor Patrick Pfeiffer called "harmonic syncopation". With this technique, Clayton plays a consistent rhythm that stresses the eighth note of each bar, but he "anticipates the harmony by shifting the tonality" before the guitar chords do. This gives the music a feeling of "forward motion". Initially, Clayton had no formal musical training; Bono said of Clayton's early bass playing, "Adam used to pretend he could play bass. He came round and started using words like 'action' and 'fret' and he had us baffled. He had the only amplifier, so we never argued with him. We thought this guy must be a musician; he knows what he's talking about. And then one day, we discovered he wasn't playing the right notes. That's what's wrong, y'know?" In the band's early years, Clayton generally played simple bass parts in  time consisting of steady eighth notes emphasising the roots of chords. Over time, he incorporated influences from Motown and reggae into his playing style, and as he became a better timekeeper, his playing became more melodic. Author Bill Flanagan said that he "often plays with the swollen, vibrating bottom sound of a Jamaican dub bassist, covering the most sonic space with the smallest number of notes". Flanagan said that Clayton's playing style perfectly reflected his personality: "Adam plays a little behind the beat, waiting till the last moment to slip in, which fits Adam's casual, don't-sweat-it personality."

Clayton relies on his own instincts when developing basslines, deciding whether to follow the chord progressions of the guitars or play a counter-melody, and when to play an octave higher or lower. He cites bassists such as Paul Simonon, Bruce Foxton, Peter Hook, Jean-Jacques Burnel, and James Jamerson as major influences on him. He credits Burnel for his choice of instrument, saying that upon hearing his bass guitar playing in the Stranglers' song "Hanging Around", Clayton "immediately [knew] it was going to be the instrument for [him]". Describing his role in U2's rhythm section with drummer Larry Mullen Jr., Clayton's said, "Larry's drums have always told me what to play, and then the chords tell me where to go". One of Clayton's most recognizable basslines is from "New Year's Day", which was borne out of an attempt to play Visage's song "Fade to Grey".

Clayton has sung on some occasions, including on the song "Endless Deep", the B-side to the single "Two Hearts Beat As One" from 1983. Clayton also sang backup vocals on "I Will Follow", "Twilight", "Trip Through Your Wires" and also on some occasions on "With or Without You" and "Bullet the Blue Sky" during live performances. He also spoke the last verse of "Your Blue Room". Clayton can be heard speaking on "Tomorrow ('96 Version)" (a rerecording of "Tomorrow" that he arranged) a song from U2's 1981 album October. He plays the guitar on a few occasions, most notably the song "40", where he and guitarist the Edge switch instruments. He also plays the keyboards on "City of Blinding Lights" and "Iris (Hold Me Close)".

Musical equipment 

Claytons first bass was a walnut brown Ibanez Musician, which he played heavily from the recording of Boy and well though the War era. Two years later, at the age of 16, Clayton asked his father to purchase a second-hand Precision for him when Brian Clayton travelled to New York, as he felt he needed a better guitar to master the instrument.

For the rest of his career, he was mainly known for using various Fender Precision and Jazz basses.
Clayton's Precision basses have been modified with a Fender Jazz neck. In an interview with Bass Player magazine, he said that he prefers the Jazz bass neck because it is more "lady-like" and is a better fit in his left hand. In 2011 the Fender Custom Shop produced a limited-edition signature Precision Bass built to his own specifications in a limited run of 60 pieces, featuring an alder body and a gold sparkle finish. In 2014, Fender announced a signature Adam Clayton Jazz Bass guitar, modeled after a Sherwood Green 1965 Jazz Bass he played during the 2001 Elevation Tour.

Clayton's basses include:
 Fender Precision Bass
 Fender Jazz Bass
 Ibanez Musician Bass
 Warwick Adam Clayton Reverso Signature Bass 
 Warwick Streamer Bass
 Warwick Star Bass II
 Gibson Thunderbird Bass
 Gibson Les Paul Triumph Bass
 Gibson Les Paul 70's Recording Bass, unknown model
 Gibson Les Paul Signature Bass
 Lakland Joe Osborn Signature Bass
 Lakland Darryl Jones Signature Bass (with Chi-Sonic pick-ups)
 Auerswald Custom Bass
 Epiphone Rivoli bass (seen in the "Get on Your Boots" music video)
 Rickenbacker 4001 Bass - used in the early days of U2 circa 1978/79
 Status John Entwistle Buzzard Bass
 Gibson RD Bass

For amplification Clayton started out on Ashdown amplifiers, and later switched to using Aguilar amplifiers.
 Aguilar DB 751 bass amp
 Aguilar DB 410 & 115 cabs

Personal life
Clayton served as the best man in Bono's wedding to Alison Hewson (née Stewart) in 1982.

Clayton made the news in August 1989 when he was arrested in Dublin for carrying a small amount of marijuana. However, he avoided conviction by making a large donation to charity, and later commented: "it was my own fault. And I'm sure I was out of my head – emotionally apart from anything else. But it is serious because it is illegal." Clayton has also had alcohol problems, which came to a head during the Zoo TV Tour. On 26 November 1993 he was so hung over that he was unable to play that night's show in Sydney, the dress rehearsal for their Zoo TV concert film. Bass duties had to be fulfilled by Clayton's technician Stuart Morgan. After that incident, he resolved to give up alcohol, eventually beginning his sobriety in 1996. On 26 June 2017, Clayton received the Stevie Ray Vaughan Award at the MusiCares 13th annual MAP Fund Benefit Concert in recognition of his commitment to helping others with addiction recovery.

Clayton remained a bachelor for several decades until his marriage in 2013. During the early 1990s, he dated English supermodel Naomi Campbell. He also had a long-standing relationship with Suzanne "Susie" Smith, a former assistant to Paul McGuinness; they were engaged in 2006, but the pair broke up in February 2007. In 2010, Clayton fathered a son with his then-partner, an unnamed French woman. In 2013, he confirmed that he was no longer in that relationship. On 4 September 2013, Clayton married former human rights lawyer Mariana Teixeira de Carvalho in a ceremony in Dublin. The Independent reported in 2015 that de Carvalho, originally from Brazil, works as a director at Michael Werner, a leading contemporary art gallery in London and New York.

In 2009, the High Court ordered the assets of Carol Hawkins, Clayton's former housekeeper and personal assistant, be frozen after it was reported that she misappropriated funds of  €1.8 million. At the subsequent trial that figure was stated to be €2.8 million. Hawkins denied the charges but in 2012 was convicted by a jury of 181 counts of theft and sentenced to seven years imprisonment.

On 25 July 2017, Clayton and his wife announced the arrival of their first daughter. They declined to divulge where and when she was born.

Charity work
In 2011, Clayton became an ambassador for the Dublin-based St Patrick's Hospital's Mental Health Service "Walk in My Shoes" facility.

Awards and recognition

Clayton and U2 have won numerous awards in their career, including 22 Grammy awards, including those for Best Rock Duo or Group seven times, Album of the Year twice, Record of the Year twice, Song of the Year twice, and Best Rock Album twice. In March 2005, Clayton was inducted into the Rock and Roll Hall of Fame as a member of U2, in their first year of eligibility.

See also
 List of bass guitarists
 Timeline of U2
 U2 discography

References
Footnotes

Bibliography

External links
 Official U2 website

1960 births
English rock bass guitarists
English rock guitarists
British post-punk musicians
Irish bass guitarists
Irish rock guitarists
Male bass guitarists
Golden Globe Award-winning musicians
Ivor Novello Award winners
Living people
People educated at Mount Temple Comprehensive School
People educated at St Columba's College, Dublin
People from South Oxfordshire District
People from Malahide
Musicians from Dublin (city)
U2 members
Alternative rock bass guitarists
Kennedy Center honorees